A Winter Harbor 21 (also known as a Winter Harbor Knockabout) is a 31′0″ x 7′3″ one-design racing sloop designed and built by Burgess & Packard, of Marblehead, Massachusetts, in 1907.

History
In 1906, Fredrick O. Spedden and George Dallas Dixon Jr., members of Maine's Winter Harbor Yacht Club commissioned Starling Burgess and his partner, Alpheus A. Packard to create a one-design racing sloop for the club. Their firm, Burgess & Packard, produced the Winter Harbor 21, a knockabout. Seven boats were built by Burgess & Packard and launched in 1907. Two more boats were built by George Lawley & Son in 1920 and 1924, bringing the total fleet to 9.

During World War II and the 1950s, the fleet was gradually sold and dispersed until only El Fitz and one other knockabout remained active at the Winter Harbor Yacht Club.

In 1979, Alan Goldstein, commodore of the Winter Harbor Yacht Club, decided while sailing on one of the two remaining boats that he wanted one of his own. It took him two years of diligent searching before he discovered the boat Cloverly in poor condition  rotting in a barn. After extensive rebuilding there were three Winter Harbor 21s racing once more in Winter Harbor. It took ten more years before the remaining six sloops had been found, restored and returned to Winter Harbor.

It's thought that the Winter Harbor 21s are the oldest intact one-design racing sailboat fleet in the United States.

Boats and owners

Name – Year Built – color – owner
Mystery – 1907 – pink – Dexter Coffin family
Whippet – 1907 – white – Samuel Heffner Family – restored by Benjamin River Marine, Brooklyn, Maine
Cloverly – 1907 – maroon – Dan Gans
Riddle – 1907 – green – Chas Wiggins
Water Witch – 1907 – yellow – Dexter Coffin Family – restored by Redd's Pond Boatworks and Marblehead Trading Company, Marblehead, Massachusetts
Rambler II – 1907 – gray – Ben Irons
Sphinx – 1907 – red-orange – Alex Mishkin
Sole – 1922 – blue – Edith Dixon
El Fitz – 1924 – varnish – Hilary Dixon Miller

References

 Victoria Reiter Goldstein, "The Fortunate Fleet: A century of Sailing in Winter Harbor Knockabouts".

Marblehead, Massachusetts
Sailing yachts
1900s sailboat type designs